Laurence is an English and French given name (usually female in French and usually male in English). The English masculine  name is a variant of Lawrence and it originates from a French form of the Latin Laurentius, a name meaning "man from Laurentum".

The French feminine name Laurence is a form of the masculine Laurent, which is derived from the Latin name.

Given name
 Laurence Broze (born 1960), Belgian applied mathematician, statistician, and economist
 Laurence des Cars, French curator and art historian
 Laurence Neil Creme, known professionally as Lol Creme, British musician
 Laurence Ekperigin (born 1988), British-American basketball player in the Israeli National League
 Laurence Equilbey, French conductor
 Laurence Fishburne (born 1961), American actor
 Laurence Fournier Beaudry, Canadian ice dancer
 Laurence Fox (born 1978), British actor
Laurence Gayte (born 1965), French politician
 Laurence S. Geller, British-born, US-based real estate investor.
 Laurence Ginnell, Irish politician
 Laurence Godfrey (archer), British athlete
 Laurence Godfrey (physics lecturer), regular and controversial contributor to the Usenet newsgroups 'soc.culture.British' and 'soc.culture.Canada'
 Laurence Golborne, Chilean mining and energy minister
 Laurence Harvey, Lithuanian-born actor
 Laurence Keitt, Confederate general
 Laurence "Laurie" Lee (1914–1997), British poet and novelist
 Laurence Llewelyn-Bowen, British television presenter and designer
 Laurence McKeown, Provisional Irish Republican Army member
 Laurence Myers (1858–99), American world-record-setting runner
 Laurence Olivier (1907–1989), British actor and director
 Laurence Owen, American figure skater
 Laurence J. Rittenband (1905–1993), American judge
 Laurence Rochat, Swiss cross-country skier who has competed since 1996
 Laurence Sullivan, British writer
 Laurence Andrew Tolhurst, known professionally as Lol Tolhurst, British musician
 Laurence Tribe, American professor of constitutional law
 Laurence Tureaud (born 1952), known professionally as Mr. T, American actor and wrestler
 St Laurence O'Toole, or Lorcán Ua Tuathail, Irish Roman Catholic Saint
 Laurence of Canterbury, the second Archbishop of Canterbury
 Laurence Tubiana, French Ambassador responsible for COP21
Laurence Vichnievsky (born 1955), French politician and magistrate

Surname
 Duncan Laurence (born 1994), Dutch singer, representing Netherlands in Eurovision Song Contest 2019 
 Elizabeth Laurence (born 1949), English classical mezzo-soprano singer
 French Laurence (17571809), English lawyer and politician, brother of Richard
 John Zachariah Laurence (182970), English ophthalmologist
 Richard Laurence (17601838), English Hebraist and Anglican churchman, brother of French
 Samuel Laurence (181284), British portrait painter
 Stephen Laurence (born before 1998), American philosopher
 Timothy Laurence (born 1955) retired  British Royal Navy officer and second husband of Anne, Princess Royal
 William L. Laurence (18881977), Lithuanian-American science journalist for The New York Times (193064)

See also
 Larry (disambiguation)
 Lars
 Laurent (disambiguation)
 Laurentius (disambiguation)
 Laura and Lauren, feminine derivatives
 Laurance (name)

References

English-language masculine given names
English masculine given names
French masculine given names
English feminine given names
French feminine given names
Surnames from given names